Philatelic Federation of Pakistan is the governing body of philately in Pakistan. It is a member of Fédération Internationale de Philatélie (FIP) and Federation of Inter-Asian Philately (F.I.A.P.).

Executive Board
The current president (2010–2011) is Mr. Muhammad Nawaz from Peshawar.

Past Presidents
 Salman Qureshi
 Usman Ali Isani
 Khalid Malik

References

External links
 Official Website

Philatelic organizations
Philately of Pakistan
Members of the Fédération Internationale de Philatélie